This is a list of Luxembourgish sports players.

Alpine skiing
 Marc Girardelli
 Raoul Weckbecker

Auto racing
 Dylan Pereira

Archery
 Jeff Henckels

Athletics
 Josy Barthel (Middle-distance running)
 Roland Bombardella (Sprinting)
 David Fiegen (Middle-distance running)
 Norbert Haupert (Middle-distance running)
 Michel Théato (Marathon)

Basketball
 Alvin Jones

Bobsleigh
 Raoul Weckbecker

Boxing
 Fernand Backes
 Fernand Ciatti
 Ray Cillien

Carom billiards
 Fonsy Grethen

Chess
 Alberto David

Cycling
 Mett Clemens
 Bim Diederich
 François Faber
 Nicolas Frantz
 Charly Gaul
 Jean Goldschmit
 Benoît Joachim
 Willy Kemp
 Jeng Kirchen
 Kim Kirchen
 Jean Majerus
 Arsène Mersch
 François Neuens
 Andy Schleck
 Fränk Schleck
 Johny Schleck
 Jempy Schmitz
 Edy Schütz
 Christine Majerus

Fencing
 Colette Flesch
 Robert Schiel

Figure skating
 Fleur Maxwell

Football
 Manuel Cardoni
 Dan Collette
 Stéphane Gillet
 Patrick Grettnich
 Émile Hamilius
 Guy Hellers
 Daniel Huss
 Serge Jentgen
 Aurélien Joachim
 Antoine Kohn
 François Konter
 Robby Langers
 Alphonse Leweck
 Charles Leweck
 Léon Mart
 Luc Mischo
 Mario Mutsch
 Marc Oberweis
 Ben Payal
 Paul Philipp
 Louis Pilot
 Claude Reiter
 Sébastien Rémy
 Chris Sagramola
 Jeff Strasser
 Carlo Weis

Gymnastics
 Josy Stoffel

Mountaineering
 Eugène Berger

Strongman
 Georges Christen

Swimming
 Alwin de Prins

Table tennis
 Jeanny Dom

Tennis
 Anne Kremer
 Mandy Minella
 Gilles Müller
 Claudine Schaul

Triathlon
 Dirk Bockel
 Nancy Kemp-Arendt
 Elizabeth May

Waterskiing
 Sylvie Hülsemann

Weightlifting
 Joseph Alzin

Wrestling
 Joseph Alzin

Luxembourgian